Blagica Pavlovska (born 1958) is a Macedonian singer.

Discography

Albums
Nemozam Da Te Zaboravam (1993)
Ptičica (1993) 
Vljubena žena (1995)
Skršeno Srce (1998)
...i Celo Vranje (1998)
Spij Mirno Moja Planeto (2000)
Te Sakam Zemjo Crvena Bulko (2002)Casino (2002)Doktori 100 Da Me Lečat (2003)The Best of Blagica Pavlovska (2004)Blagica Pavlovska'' (2005)

References 

Year of birth missing (living people)
Living people
20th-century Macedonian women singers
Place of birth missing (living people)
People from Sopište Municipality
21st-century Macedonian women singers